Urban Cops is a South Korean reality show broadcast on MBC every1, where celebrities team up with real life police to experience their work and solve crimes within the city. The show is the second spin-off of Rural Police after Sea Police, which feature the same premise but in the countryside and coastal region respectively. Like the first two series, the cast are appointed as entry-level police officers and work alongside a team of mentor officers.

Season 1 aired on Mondays at 20:30 (KST) from January 14 to March 18, 2019. Jo Jae-yoon from Sea Police joined the cast alongside three new faces. They were appointed entry-level police officers in the Intellectual Crime Investigation Team at Yongsan Police Station in Seoul, shadowing them on their open cases.

Season 2, Urban Cops: KCSI, aired on Mondays at 20:30 (KST) from July 29 to September 30, 2019, with the same cast returning except Jang Hyuk, who was replaced by Chun Jung-myung. In this season, the cast joined the Korean Crime Scene Investigation's (KCSI) Forensic Investigation Unit at Seoul Metropolitan Police Agency.

Following the popularity of Seasons 1 and 2, the production crew stated in September 2019 that they were discussing the possibility of Season 3.

Cast

Main cast

Police officers 
Season 1 — Intellectual Crime Investigation Team (Yongsan Police Station, Seoul)

 Team Leader: 
 Investigators: Lee Yoo-shin, Lee Woo-ho, Jo Kyeong-jun, Yoo Seung-ryeol and Choi Woo-cheol

Season 2 — Forensic Investigation Unit (KCSI, Seoul Metropolitan Police Agency)

 Unit Chief: Lee Sang-bae
 Team Captain: Kim Jeong-yong
 Team 1: Park Seong-woo (Leader), Jo Yeong-hun
 Team 2: Choi Pyeong-yeop (Leader), Jang Dae-yeong
 Team 3: Na Je-seong (Leader), Hwang Seong-yeong

List of episodes

Season 1

Season 2

Ratings 
 Ratings listed below are the individual corner ratings of Urban Cops. (Note: Individual corner ratings do not include commercial time, which regular ratings include.)

Season 1

Season 2

References

External links 
 Season 1 
 Season 2 

South Korean reality television series
Korean-language television shows
2019 South Korean television series debuts
South Korean crime television series